Nelson Estupiñán Bass (1912–2002) was born in Súa, a city in the predominantly Afro-Ecuadorian province of Esmeraldas in Ecuador.  He was first homeschooled by his mother before traveling to the capital city of Quito where he graduated from Escuela Superior Juan Montalvo with a degree in public accounting in 1932.  Bass identified with the Communist Party during this time and in 1934 had the opportunity to publish two of his poems (Canto a la Negra Quinceañera and Anúteba) in the socialist diary La Tierra.

Career
In 1943, Bass completed the novel, When the Guayacanes Were in Bloom (Cuando Los Guayacanes Florecían), one of his most famous and widely read literary projects throughout Ecuador and Latin America.  It was published in 1950 by the Casa de la Cultura Ecuatoriana.  The novel expresses the fraught situation of Afro-Ecuadorians used as pawns to fight for the Conservative Party and Liberal Party during the Liberal Revolution in Ecuador of 1895  Bass was influenced by global Pan-Africanism and invoked an identifiably black aesthetic and political project in his writings and lectures during the 1940s and 50s.

In 1962, Bass married Luz Argentina Chiriboga, who later became known for writing on Afro-Ecuadorian and feminist themes. In 1966 Bass was the first president of a regional museum of the national Casa de la Cultura Ecuatoriana in Esmeraldas called Archaeological Museum "Carlos Mercado Ortiz".

Bass was nominated for the Nobel Prize in Literature in 1998.  While giving a series of lectures in 2002 at Penn State University Bass became ill with pneumonia and succumbed to the deadly illness at the Hershey Medical Center. Bass is remembered as one of Ecuador's most prolific Afro-Latin American writers and represents a South American expression of the African Diaspora

Works

Novels 

 Cuando los guayacanes florecían (Quito, 1954)
 El paraíso (Quito, 1958)
 El último río (Quito, 1966)
 Senderos brillantes (Quito, 1974)
 Las puertas del verano (Quito, 1978)
 Toque de queda (Guayaquil, 1978)
 Bajo el cielo nublado (Quito, 1981)
 Los canarios pintaron el aire amarillo (Quito, 1993)
 Al norte de Dios (Quito, 1994).

Poetry 

 Canto negro por la luz (Quito, 1956)
 Timarán y cuabú (Quito, 1956)
 Las huellas digitales (Quito, 1971)
 Las tres carabelas (Portoviejo, 1973)
 negra bullanguera  (1980).

Essays and criticism 

 Luces que titilan: guía de la vieja Esmeraldas (Esmeraldas, 1977)
 Viaje alrededor de la poesía negra (Quito, 1982)
 Desde un balcón volado (Quito, 1992)
 El Crepúsculo (1983)

References

1912 births
2002 deaths
20th-century Ecuadorian poets
Ecuadorian male poets
Ecuadorian novelists
Male novelists
20th-century novelists
People from Esmeraldas Province
Deaths from pneumonia in Pennsylvania
20th-century male writers